The 2005 season was the 14th full year of competitive football in the Baltic country as an independent nation. The Estonia national football team played a total number of twelve international matches in 2005, and did not qualify for the 2006 FIFA World Cup in Germany.

Venezuela vs Estonia

Estonia vs Slovakia

Estonia vs Russia

Estonia vs Norway

Estonia vs Liechtenstein

Estonia vs Portugal

Estonia vs Bosnia & Herzegovina

Estonia vs Latvia

Slovakia vs Estonia

Luxembourg vs Estonia

Finland vs Estonia

Poland vs Estonia

Notes

References
 RSSSF detailed results

2005
2005 national football team results
National